Tarik El Jarmouni is a Moroccan football goalkeeper. He last played for Raja CA.

Jermouni played for FAR in the 2007 CAF Champions League group stages.

Jermouni played for Morocco at the 2000 Summer Olympics in Sydney.

References

External links

1977 births
Living people
Moroccan footballers
Moroccan expatriate footballers
Morocco international footballers
Footballers at the 2000 Summer Olympics
Olympic footballers of Morocco
Wydad AC players
Raja CA players
FC Dynamo-3 Kyiv players
AS FAR (football) players
Expatriate footballers in Ukraine
Moroccan expatriate sportspeople in Ukraine
2002 African Cup of Nations players
2004 African Cup of Nations players
People from Mohammedia
Zamalek SC players
2006 Africa Cup of Nations players
Association football goalkeepers